Ondřej Kepka (born 28 September 1969 in Prague) is a Czech actor, film director, screenwriter, presenter and photographer.

Career 
From 6 years he performed in several films for children and in the Czech Radio. His acting includes roles in the popular TV series Arabela and Arabela returns. In 1992 after graduation from the Theatre Faculty of the Academy of Performing Arts in Prague in acting he continued the study of the film director at the Film and TV School of the Academy of Performing Arts in Prague, where he graduated in 1996. His acting theaters includes Divadlo pod Palmovkou and Studio GAG by Boris Hybner. In Czech Radio he moderates the "Noční mikrofórum" program.

Since November 2017 he is a President of the Czech Association of Actors ("Herecká asociace").

Filmography
His works include:

Film 
1995 - Tvůj svět (student film)  
1996 - Dívka se zázračnou pamětí (TV film), Když sbírala jsem rozmarýn (theater recording)
1998 - Hřích faráře Ondřeje (TV film) 
1999 - Spirála nenávisti (TV film)
2003 - Stará láska nerezaví (TV film)  
2004 - Smetanový svět (TV film), Zakletá třináctka (TV film)  
2006 - Poslední kouzlo (TV film)
2007 - V jámě lvové (theatre recording), Začarovaná láska (TV film)  
2008 - Bekyně mniška (TV film), Picasso (theatre recording), Smrt Pavla I. (theatre recording), Ten třetí (theatre recording)  
2012 - Scapinova šibalství (theatre recording)  
2013 - Poprvé vdaná (theatre recording)  
2016 - Den opričníka (theatre recording)

TV series 
2004 - 3 plus 1, with Miroslav Donutil
2005 - To nevymyslíš!, Ulice

Documentary films 
1995 - Obyčejné věci člověka (TV film)  
1996 - Příběh knihy kostýmů (TV film)  
1998 - Cesta ke slunci (TV film), Obyčejný život (TV film)  
2000 - Osudy hvězd: Julie... Lucie Vondráčková (TV film)  
2002 - Příběhy slavných: Byla jsem na světě (TV film)  
2003 - Předčasná úmrtí: Sobí ráno (TV film)  
2005 - Návštěva u Radovana Lukavského (TV film)  
2007 - Den v DD (TV film), Osudy hvězd: Veronika Týblová (TV film)  
2008 - Karel Čapek a jeho obyčejný svět (TV film)  
2009 - Městské divadlo Mladá Boleslav (TV film), Neobyčejné životy (TV series)  
2010 - Království poezie Gabriely Vránové (TV film)  
2011 - Neobyčejné životy: Gustav Oplustil, Příběhy slavných: Poslední romantik
2012 - Neobyčejné životy: Emília Vášáryová (TV film)  
2013 - Příběhy slavných - Frajer a fanfarón (TV series)  
2014 - 4H aneb Hovory o herectví v hotelu Hoffmeister: Jiřina Jirásková, Radovan Lukavský
2015 - Dopisy od Karla Čapka (TV film)

DVD 
 2010 - Království poezie (Kingdom of poetry)
 2011 - Ondřejova filmová škola (in Czech) – 33 popular video learning series for the starting film producers

References

Sources
Article contains translated text from Ondřej Kepka on the Czech Wikipedia retrieved on 18 January 2018.

External links

Ondřej Kepka Official Website
Profile on the Czech Film Database
Profile on the Czech Movie Heaven

Czech actors
Czech theatre directors
Czech screenwriters
Male screenwriters
Photographers from Prague
Academy of Performing Arts in Prague alumni
Writers from Prague
Film directors from Prague
Male actors from Prague
1969 births
Living people